İsaqbağı (also, Isakbagi and Isakbagy) is a village and municipality in the Zardab Rayon of Azerbaijan.  It has a population of 1,195. The municipality consists of the villages of İsaqbağı and Böyük Dəkkə.

References 

Populated places in Zardab District